Rajmata Vijayaraje Scindia Krishi Vishwa Vidyalaya (RVSKVV) is an agricultural state university located in Gwalior, Madhya Pradesh, India. It was established in 2008 by splitting the horticulture department, and the veterinary science and animal husbandry departments of Jawaharlal Nehru Krishi Vishwa Vidyalaya (JNKVV).

References

External links
 

2008 establishments in Madhya Pradesh
Agricultural universities and colleges in Madhya Pradesh
Educational institutions established in 2008
Universities and colleges in Gwalior
Universities in Madhya Pradesh